MTV2 Headbangers Ball: The Revenge is a double album compilation of metal music released in association with the MTV2 program Headbangers Ball. The CD includes 38 tracks, in excess of 2½ hours of music, from both established and up-and-coming artists. The track selection includes rarities, live performances, as well as tracks never before available.

Two versions appear to exist, with different track lists. The U.S. version has three British bands, while the European version has only one, Bullet for My Valentine.

Track listing (US version)

European version
The only differences between the US and European version are as follows:

On disc one of the European version, "Carved Inside" by Soulfly has replaced "The Trooper (live)" by Iron Maiden.
On disc two of the European version, "Slaves Shall Serve" by Behemoth has replaced "Through the Fire and Flames" by DragonForce.

See also
Headbangers Ball

References

External links
Roadrunner official website

2006 compilation albums
Roadrunner Records compilation albums
Heavy metal compilation albums
Thrash metal compilation albums
Nu metal compilation albums
Melodic death metal compilation albums
Metalcore compilation albums
Power metal compilation albums
Gothic metal compilation albums